Rapšach is a municipality and village in Jindřichův Hradec District in the South Bohemian Region of the Czech Republic. It has about 600 inhabitants.

Administrative parts
The village of Nová Ves u Klikova is an administrative part of Rapšach.

References

Villages in Jindřichův Hradec District